Hussar's Picture Book is a memoir by the Hungarian author Pál Kelemen. Based on the author's personal diary and covering the entire period of World War I from 1914 to 1918, the book is a memoir of the experiences of a Hungarian cavalry officer of the Blue Hussars of the Imperial army of the Austro-Hungarian Monarchy. 

The book provides an uncommon perspective on the war as it is written by a well-educated, multi-lingual, Hungarian officer serving in multiple fronts. Though battles and combat feature throughout, the main focus is on the author's personal life. The war serves as a backdrop to a man of high birth in a society struggling to adapt to the modern world. The portrait provided of war on the eastern front is starkly different from that of the western front described in novels such as Le Feu (Under Fire). Antiquated militaria such as cavalry regiments are only eliminated near the end of the war period.

The memoir presents a fairly positive view of the author's service. Written in a different time period, it could easily have passed for pro-war propaganda. Parts of the author's diary were used as such during the war period by the Hungarian government. For most of the novel, the view of the war is a positive one and the author's personal experiences harken back to the romantic and idealistic notions of war.

1972 non-fiction books
History books about World War I
Personal accounts of World War I